Kim Tal-hyon (1941–2000) was a North Korean politician who was deputy prime minister of the economy. As a technocrat, he is known for his work on the Tumen River project. The project was a limited experiment in free market reform, but was ultimately quashed by North Korean dictator Kim Jong-il.

In July 1992, Deputy Prime Minister Kim Tal-hyon, widely known as the North's highest economic policymaker and a "technocrat," made an extensive tour of industrial plants in South Korea with a view toward economic cooperation in the near future. He proposed pilot joint venture projects in the Nampo light industrial complex of North Korea.

References

Government ministers of North Korea
1941 births
2000 deaths